The second season of Drag Race España premiered on March 27, 2022. The season aired on ATRESplayer Premium in Spain and WOW Presents Plus internationally.

The twelve contestants were announced on February 20, 2022. Jota Carajota is the youngest participant in this franchise and wider Drag Race franchise ever to be cast.

The winner of the season was Sharonne, with Estrella Xtravaganza and Venedita Von Däsh as runner-ups.

Contestants

Ages, names, and cities stated are at time of filming.

Notes:

Contestant progress

Lip syncs
Legend:

Guest judges 
Listed in chronological order:

Gloria Trevi, singer and songwriter
La Zowi, singer and songwriter
Eduardo Casanova, actor and filmmaker
La Prohibida, singer and drag queen
María León, actress
Choriza May, contestant on the third season of RuPaul's Drag Race UK
Ruth Lorenzo, singer and songwriter
Anabel Alonso, actress and comedian
Alexis Mateo, contestant on season three of RuPaul's Drag Race and season one and season five of RuPaul's Drag Race All Stars

Special guests
Guests who appeared in episodes, but did not judge on the main stage.

Episode 1
Mista, photographer

Episode 2
Arantxa Castilla La Mancha, contestant on the first season of Drag Race España
Carmen Farala, winner on the first season of Drag Race España
Dovima Nurmi, contestant on the first season of Drag Race España
Drag Vulcano, contestant on the first season of Drag Race España
Hugáceo Crujiente, contestant on the first season of Drag Race España
Inti, contestant on the first season of Drag Race España
Killer Queen, runner-up on the first season of Drag Race España
Pupi Poisson, contestant and Miss Congeniality on the first season of Drag Race España
Sagittaria, runner-up on the first season of Drag Race España
The Macarena, contestant on the first season of Drag Race España

Episode 4
Carlos Marco, singer and music producer
Carmelo Segura, choreographer

Episode 5
Eva Hache, comedian and actress
Jedet, actress and singer

Episode 8
Carmen Farala, winner on the first season of Drag Race España
Dovima Nurmi, contestant on the first season of Drag Race España
Killer Queen, runner-up on the first season of Drag Race España
Pupi Poisson, contestant and Miss Congeniality on the first season of Drag Race España
Sagittaria, runner-up on the first season of Drag Race España

Episode 10
Karina, singer
Manila Luzon, contestant on season three of RuPaul's Drag Race and season one and season four of RuPaul's Drag Race All Stars
Pedro Almodóvar, filmmaker
, performer and activist
Yara Sofia, contestant on season three of RuPaul's Drag Race and season one and season six of RuPaul's Drag Race All Stars

Episode 11
Carmelo Segura, choreographer
Carmen Farala, winner on the first season of Drag Race España

Episodes
<onlyinclude>

References

2022 in LGBT history
2022 Spanish television seasons
Drag Race España seasons